Kirikumäe Landscape Conservation Area is a nature park situated in Võru County, Estonia.

Its area is 362 ha.

The protected area was designated in 1983 to protect Kirikumäe Lake and its surrounding areas. In 2000, the protected area was redesigned to the landscape conservation area.

References

Nature reserves in Estonia
Geography of Võru County